Hopea wightiana is a species of plant in the family Dipterocarpaceae. It is endemic to India.

References

Flora of India (region)
wightiana
Endangered plants
Taxonomy articles created by Polbot